Sidalcea reptans is a species of flowering plant in the mallow family known by the common name Sierra checkerbloom and Sierra checker mallow.

Distribution
It grows in moist and dry habitat types in the mountains, in meadows of yellow pine forest and red fir forest.

Description
Lower portions of the stem sometimes root when in contact with moist substrate. It is coated in long, bristly hairs.

The leaf blades are also bristly. They vary in shape, the lower ones barely lobed and borne on long petioles, and the higher ones often deeply cut into lobes.

The inflorescence is a long, open series of flowers with pink to lavender petals up to 2 centimeters in length. The bloom period is June to August.

References

External links
Jepson Manual eFlora (TJM2) treatment of Sidalcea reptans
USDA Plants Profile for Sidalcea reptans (Sierra checkerbloom)
 

reptans
Endemic flora of California
Flora of the Sierra Nevada (United States)
Flora without expected TNC conservation status